Aortic rupture is the rupture or breakage of the aorta, the largest artery in the body. Aortic rupture is a rare, extremely dangerous condition. The most common cause is an abdominal aortic aneurysm that has ruptured spontaneously. Aortic rupture is distinct from aortic dissection, which is a tear through the inner wall of the aorta that can block the flow of blood through the aorta to the heart or abdominal organs.

An aortic rupture can be classified according to its cause into one of the following main types:
 Traumatic aortic rupture
 Aortic rupture secondary to an aortic aneurysm

Signs and symptoms

Symptoms
 Tearing pain, located in the abdomen, flank, groin, or back
 Loss of consciousness

Signs
 Low blood pressure from hypovolemic shock
 Fast heart rate
 Blue discoloration of the skin
 Altered mental status
 Bruising of the flank, a sign of retroperitoneal bleeding.
 Death

Causes
The most common cause of aortic rupture is a ruptured aortic aneurysm. Other causes include trauma and iatrogenic (procedure-related) causes.

Mechanism
The wall of the aorta is an elastic structure which requires integrity. Rupture results from either loss of wall strength to the point at which systemic pressure is greater than wall strength, or external destruction of the wall of the aorta, by a tumor or traumatic means. The bleeding can be retroperitoneal or intraperitoneal, or the rupture can create an aortocaval (between the aorta and inferior vena cava) or aortoenteric (between the aorta and intestine) fistula.

Diagnosis
The condition is often suspected in patients close to death with abdominal trauma or with relevant risk-factors. Diagnosis may be confirmed by ultrasound or X-ray computed tomography (CT) scan.

Prevention

Prevention of aortic rupture begins with screening for disease of the aorta. If indicated, treatment with EVAR or open repair of the diseased aorta can limit the risk of aortic rupture.

Treatment
Aortic ruptures can be repaired surgically via open aortic surgery or using endovascular therapy (EVAR), regardless of cause, just as non-ruptured aortic aneurysms are repaired. An aortic occlusion balloon can be placed to stabilize the patient and prevent further blood loss prior to the induction of anesthesia.

Prognosis
An aortic rupture is a catastrophic medical emergency. People rarely survive such an injury. Mortality from aortic rupture is up to 90%. 65–75% of patients die before they arrive at hospital and up to 90% die before they reach the operating room.

References

Diseases of the aorta